Tombs is an American heavy metal band from Brooklyn, New York, formed in 2007. Thus far, the group has released five full-length records, Winter Hours, Path of Totality, Savage Gold, The Grand Annihilation, and Under Sullen Skies.

History
The group was founded by guitarist/vocalist Mike Hill, bassist Domic Seita and drummer Justin Ennis in 2007. In 2009, the group released their first full-length album, Winter Hours through Relapse Records, and in 2011, released their second full-length album, Path of Totality. The album was met with critical acclaim. A song titled "Ashes" was featured in the Decibel Magazine October 2012 issue as a part of its Flexi-Series. On August 29, 2012, another song titled "Heroes", originally by David Bowie, was made available for streaming on Ghettoblaster. According to Mike Hill, the band has half an albums worth of material already written, with the hopes of entering the studio early 2013 to record their next release. Tracking for their third record, Savage Gold, began on November 11, 2013 with producer Erik Rutan at Mana Recording Studios in Florida. On March 27, 2014, the track listing, album artwork and release date for Savage Gold were revealed. Hammer Fight guitarist Todd Sterns and bassist and lead singer Drew Murphy, joined the group in 2019.

Musical style and influences
The band's sound has been described as multiple metal styles which include black metal, post-metal, and experimental metal. Frontman Mike Hill has likened the group's sound to being more black metal inspired. Citing influences, Hill has named bands such as Neurosis, Swans, Joy Division, Darkthrone, Black Flag, Deathspell Omega, Leviathan and Bauhaus, among others, as being influential to the group's sound.

Band members
Current
 Mike Hill – lead vocals, guitars, synths (2007–present)
 Justin Spaeth – drums, synths, guitars (2017–present)
 Drew Murphy – bass, backing vocals (2018–present)
 Todd Sterns – guitars (2019–present)

Former
 Andrew Hernandez – drums (2009–2014)
 Dan Howard – guitars (2012)
 Carson Daniel James – bass (2009–2012)
 Justin Ennis – drums (2007–2009)
 Domenic Seita – bass (2007–2008)
 Garett Bussanick – guitars (2013)
 Ben Brand – bass guitar, backing vocals (2013–2017)
 Evan Void – guitars, backing vocals (2014–2017)
 Fade Kainer – synthesizers, backing vocals (2014–2017)
 Charlie Schmid – drums (2014–2017)

Timeline

Discography

Studio albums
2009: Winter Hours (Relapse Records)
2011: Path of Totality (Relapse Records)
2014: Savage Gold (Relapse Records)
2017: The Grand Annihilation (Metal Blade Records)
2020: Under Sullen Skies (Season of Mist)

Compilations
2010: Fear Is the Weapon

Extended plays
2007: Tombs
2008: Tombs/ Planks (split EP with Planks)
2016: All Empires Fall
2020: Monarchy of Shadows
2022: Ex Oblivion

References

External links

Interview with Mike Hill of Tombs at The Bone Reader

2007 establishments in New York City
American black metal musical groups
Musical groups established in 2007
Musical groups from Brooklyn
Heavy metal musical groups from New York (state)
American avant-garde metal musical groups
American post-metal musical groups
Relapse Records artists
Level Plane Records artists
Season of Mist artists
Metal Blade Records artists